The Haparapara River is a river in the Bay of Plenty area of New Zealand.

See also
List of rivers of New Zealand

References

Land Information New Zealand - Search for Place Names

Rivers of the Bay of Plenty Region
Rivers of New Zealand